Ernesto M. Morgado is a Portuguese computer scientist and software entrepreneur. He has served as Associate Professor of computer science and engineering in Instituto Superior Técnico (Technical University of Lisbon) since 1992. He was one of the people behind the creation of the Computer Science and Engineering degree of Instituto Superior Técnico (Technical University of Lisbon), in 1988, and one of the founders of the Department of Computer Science and Engineering there in 1998.

Early life
Morgado earned a licentiate degree in mechanical engineering (1976) from Instituto Superior Técnico (Technical University of Lisbon) and a Master of Science in computer science (1981) and a Ph.D. in artificial intelligence (1986) from State University of New York at Buffalo.

Career

He was lecturer of computer Science in Millard Fillmore College (State University of New York at Buffalo) in 1980 and Canisius College (1981–1984).

In 1986, together with João Pavão Martins, he founded SISCOG - Sistemas Cognitivos, SA, a startup devoted to Artificial Intelligence. Together they led the company to develop and deploy software systems in railway and metro companies throughout Europe. These systems plan and manage more than 20,000 people, affect the life of millions of passengers, and have been recognized by organisations in Europe and the United States.

Morgado is also involved in the food industry.

He is president of Ernesto Morgado S.A., a rice huller company founded by his grandfather in 1920. Since 2003, he transformed the company's focus from staple foods to value-added products, namely high-quality ready meals based on rice.

He became president of FERM (Federation of European Rice Millers) at its inception in 2002, president of ANIA (Portuguese Rice Millers Association) in 1990, and vice-president of COTArroz (Portuguese Rice Chain Association) in 2004. At FIPA (Portuguese Food Industry Federation), he is currently, and for the second time, president of the Board (1997–2003 and 2009) and served as vice-president of its Executive Committee (1990–1997) and presidency of the Control Council (2003–2009).

He was a member of CIP (Portuguese Industry Confederation) Council of Presidents (1990–2007).

Author 
Morgado is author/co-author of:

References

Artificial intelligence researchers
Year of birth missing (living people)
Living people
Academic staff of the University of Lisbon
Place of birth missing (living people)
University of Lisbon alumni
University at Buffalo alumni